Ramsden's least gecko (Sphaerodactylus ramsdeni) is a species of lizard in the family Sphaerodactylidae. The species is endemic to Cuba.

Etymology
The specific name, ramsdeni, is in honor of herpetologist Charles Theodore Ramsden (1876–1951), who collected the holotype in 1914.

Habitat
The preferred habitat of S. ramsdeni is forest.

Description
S. ramsdeni has a very large rostral which is bordered posteriorly by six scales. The scales between the orbits are smooth. The dorsal scales are small. The ventrals are smooth. The posterior margin of each caudal is convex.

Reproduction
S. ramsdeni is oviparous.

References

Further reading
Rösler H (2000). "Kommentiert Liste der rezent, subrezent und fossil bekannten Geckotaxa (Reptilia: Gekkonomorpha)". Gekkota 2: 28–153. (Sphaerodactylus ramsdeni, p. 113). (in German).
Ruibal R (1959). "A New Species of Sphaerodactylus from Oriente, Cuba". Herpetologica 15 (2): 89–93. (Sphaerodactylus ramsdeni, new species).
Schwartz A, Henderson RW (1991). Amphibians and Reptiles of the West Indies: Descriptions, Distributions, and Natural History. Gainesville, Florida: University of Florida Press. 720 pp. . (Sphaerodactylus ramsdeni, p. 524).
Schwartz A, Thomas R (1975). A Check-list of West Indian Amphibians and Reptiles. Carnegie Museum of Natural History Special Publication No. 1. Pittsburgh, Pennsylvania: Carnegie Museum of Natural History. 216 pp. (Sphaerodactylus ramsdeni, p. 160).

Sphaerodactylus
Reptiles of Cuba
Endemic fauna of Cuba
Reptiles described in 1959